Glassthorpe is a deserted hamlet and manor between Flore and Upper Heyford in the Hundred of Nobottle of Daventry District, in Northamptonshire, England.

History
Glassthorpe was mentioned in the Domesday Book as Glassthorpehill, and had a recorded population of six people, paying 1.8 geld units in tax at the time. The feudal lord in 1088 was William of Keynes. 
It is mentioned in the Nomina Villarum of 1316  and was still inhabited in 1371. In 1515 it was acquired by John Spencer of the prominent Spencer family of aristocrats of Althorp. In 1547  "Classthorpe Pasture" was documented to have 200 sheep. 
By the early 18th century Glassthorpe had been "long depopulated", and only contained a single shepherd's house.

References

Bibliography

Hamlets in Northamptonshire
Manor houses in England
West Northamptonshire District